Survive is the verb form of survival.

Survive may also refer to:

Music
 Survive (band), electronica group

Albums 
 Survive (B'z album), or the title song
 Survive (Much the Same album)
 Survive (Nuclear Assault album), or the title song
 Survive (Stratovarius album), was released in 2022

Songs 
 "Survive" (David Bowie song)
 "Survive", by Baker Boy featuring Uncle Jack Charles from the 2021 album Gela
 "Survive", by Miyavi, 2010
 "Survive", by Rise Against from the 2006 album The Sufferer & the Witness
 "Survive", by Lacuna Coil from the 2009 album Shallow Life

Other uses
 Survive (TV series), an American web television series
 Escape from Atlantis, a board game originally titled Survive!

See also

Survival (disambiguation)
Survivor (disambiguation)
Surviving (disambiguation)